The Ascari A10 is a prototype automobile produced by the British company Ascari Cars that was conceived by Dutch millionaire Klaas Zwart. It is a road-going evolution of the KZ1-R GT race car that participated in the Spanish GT Championship, with both cars penned by Paul Brown, former designer for the Zakspeed F1 team. It was intended to be the third road car produced by the company, after the Ecosse and the KZ1, with the name A10 intended to commemorate the 10th anniversary of the company, but it did not reach production despite a planned fifty cars.

Specifications
The A10 features a modified  BMW S62 V8 engine producing , delivered via a six-speed sequential manual gearbox, with a regular manual transmission available as an option. The A10 shares the same basic carbon fibre chassis as the KZ1, with all-new bodywork and racing-derived suspension.

Other Media
On 9 December 2007, the Ascari A10 was featured in the UK show Top Gear and driven around the track by The Stig in 1:17.3. This made it the fastest car at the time, and, as of 2015, the ninth fastest.

References 

 

A10
Sports cars
Rear mid-engine, rear-wheel-drive vehicles
Cars introduced in 2007